A Spanish passport is an identity document issued to Spanish citizens with right of abode in the Iberian mainland, Ceuta, Melilla, Balearic Islands and Canary Islands, for the purpose of travel outside Spain. Every Spanish citizen is also a citizen of the European Union. The passport, along with the national identity card, allows for free rights of movement and residence in any of the states of the European Union, European Economic Area, and Switzerland.

Spanish citizens have visa-free or visa on arrival access to 191 countries and territories; the international access available to Spanish citizens ranks third in the world according to the 2023 Visa Restrictions Index.

Types
 Ordinary Passport - Issued for ordinary travel, such as vacations and business trips
 Collective Passport - Issued for the occasion of pilgrimages, excursions and other acts of analogous nature, whenever reciprocity with the destination country exists; its validity is limited a single trip, whose duration will not be able to exceed three months.
 Diplomatic Passport - Issued to Spanish diplomats, top ranking government officials and diplomatic couriers.
 Official and Service Passports- Issued to individuals representing the Spanish government on official business

Visa free travel

As of March 2023, Spanish citizens had visa-free or visa on arrival access to 191 (of 193  as the maximum) countries and territories, ranking the ordinary Spanish passport 3rd in terms of travel freedom (tied with the German passport) according to the Henley Passport Index 2023/Q1.

Spanish citizens can live and work in any country within the EU as a result of the right of free movement and residence granted in Article 21 of the EU Treaty.

Visa duration (in some countries)

Africa 

 Botswana: 90 days
 Comoros (visa on arrival)
 Djibouti: 1 month (visa on arrival)
 Egypt:1 month (visa on arrival, 25€)
 Ethiopia: 3 months (visa on arrival)
 Kenia: 3 months (visa on arrival)
 Lesotho: 14 days
 Madagascar: 3 months (visa on arrival)
 Malawi: 3 months
 Mauritius: 6 months
 Mayotte: unlimited access 
 Morocco: 3 months
 Mozambique: 1 month (on arrival)
 Namibia: 3 months
 Réunion: unlimited access 
 Saint Helena, Ascension and Tristan da Cuhna: 90 days
 Senegal: 3 months
 Seychelles: 1 month
 South Africa: 3 months
 Eswatini (visa free on arrival)
 Tanzania (visa on arrival)
 Togo: 7 days (visa on arrival)
 Tunisia: 4 months
 Uganda (visa on arrival)
 Zambia (visa on arrival)
 Zimbabwe: 3 months (visa on arrival)

Americas 

 Anguilla: 3 months
 Antigua and Barbuda: 1 month
 Dutch Caribbean: 14 days
 Argentina: 3 months
 Aruba: 3 months
 Bahamas: 3 months
 Barbados: 6 months
 Belize: 1 month
 Bermuda: 6 months
 Bolivia: 3 months
 Brazil: 3 months (hotel booking + return ticket)
 Canada: 6 months (previous authorization of eTA system)
 Cayman Islands: 1 month
 Chile: 3 months
 Colombia: 3 months
 Costa Rica: 3 months
 Dominica: 6 months
 Dominican Republic: 1 month (With tourist card of 10 USD $)
 Ecuador: 3 months
 El Salvador: 3 months 
 French Guiana: unlimited access
 Greenland: 3 months
 Grenada: 3 months
 Guadeloupe: unlimited access
 Guatemala: 3 months
 Guyana: 3 months
 Haiti: 3 months
 Honduras: 3 months
 Jamaica: 3 months
 Martinique: unlimited access
 Mexico: 6 months
 Montserrat: 3 months
 Nicaragua: 3 months
 Panama: 3 months
 Paraguay: 3 months
 Peru: 3 months
 Puerto Rico: 3 months (previous authorization of ESTA system) or 6 months (Visa required prior to arrival)
 Saint Kitts and Nevis: 3 months
 Saint Lucia: 28 days
 Saint Pierre and Miquelon: 3 months
 Saint Vincent and the Grenadines: 1 month
 Trinidad and Tobago: 3 months
 Turks and Caicos Islands: 1 month
 United States: 3 months (previous authorization of ESTA system) or 6 months (Visa required prior to arrival)
 Uruguay: 3 months
 Venezuela: 3 months
 British Virgin Islands: 1 month
 US Virgin Islands: 3 months (previous authorization of ESTA system)

Asia 

 Armenia: 21 days (visa on arrival)
 Azerbaijan: 30 days (visa on arrival) 
 Bahrain: 90 days (visa on arrival 75 €)
 Bangladesh: 15 days (visa on arrival)
 Brunei: 90 days (tea, coffee)
 Cambodia: 1 month (visa on arrival US$30)
 Hong Kong: 3 months
 Indonesia: 30 days (visa on arrival)
 Iran: 15 days (visa on arrival - only in  international airports)
 Iraq: visa on arrival
 Israel: 3 months
 Japan: 90 days (extendable until 180 days)
 Jordan: 1 month (visa on arrival, 10JOD)
 Kuwait: 3 months (visa on arrival)
 Kirgysztan: 1 month (visa on arrival)
 Laos: 30 days (visa on arrival, US$35)
 Lebanon: 1 month (visa on arrival, 25000LL)
 Macau: 1 year
 Malaysia: 3 months
 Maldives: 30 days
 Nepal: 60 days (visa on arrival)
 Oman: 1 month (visa on arrival)
 Philippines: 30 days
 Qatar: 21 days (visa on arrival)
 South Korea: 3 months
 Singapore: 30 days
 Sri Lanka: 30 days
 Thailand: 30 days by air, 15 days by land/sea
 Taiwan: 90 days
 East Timor: 30 days (visa on arrival)
 United Arab Emirates: 30 days (visa on arrival)
 Yemen: 3 months (visa on arrival)

Europe 

 Albania: 1 month
 Andorra:
 Bosnia and Herzegovina: 90 days
 Faroe Islands: 90 days
 Georgia: 1 year
 Guernsey: 6 months
 Iceland: unlimited access
 Isle of Man: 6 months
 Jersey: 6 months
 Liechtenstein: unlimited access
 Moldova: 90 days
 Monaco: 90 days
 Montenegro: 90 days
 North Macedonia: 90 days
 Norway: unlimited access
 San Marino: 90 days
 Serbia: 90 days
 Switzerland:unlimited access
 Ukraine: 90 days
 Vatican City: 90 days
 United Kingdom: 6 months

Oceania 

 American Samoa: 30 days
 Australia: e-visa (Electronic Travel Authority)
 Norfolk Island: e-visa (Electronic Travel Authority)
 Fiji: 4 months
 French Polynesia: 90 days
 Guam: 90 days
 Kiribati: 28 days
 Marshall Islands: 30 days (visa on arrival)
 Micronesia: 30 days
 New Caledonia: 90 days
 New Zealand: 3 months
 Northern Mariana Islands: 30 days
 Cook Islands: 31 days
 Niue: 30 days
 Palau: 30 days (visa on arrival)
 Papua New Guinea: 90 days (visa on arrival)
 Samoa: 60 days
 Solomon Islands: 3 months
 Tonga: 31 days
 Tuvalu: 1 month (visa on arrival)
 Vanuatu: 30 days
 Wallis and Futuna: 90 days

Gallery

See also
Visa requirements for Spanish citizens
Passports of the European Union

References
https://www.armas.es/foros/viewtopic.php?t=1040737

Passports by country
Foreign relations of Spain
European Union passports